Kowloon East Cluster is one of the seven hospital clusters managed by Hospital Authority in Hong Kong. It consists of three public hospitals and eight general outpatient clinics to provide public healthcare services for the population of Kwun Tong and part of Sai Kung Districts (including Tseung Kwan O). In mid-2012, the population was 1,012,000. The current Cluster Chief Executive is Dr Tom Kam-tim.

Services
Kowloon East Cluster operates the following three hospitals of various capabilities to provide a range of acute, convalescent, rehabilitation, and infirmary inpatient and ambulatory care services to the public in the areas of Kwun Tong and part of Sai Kung Districts (including Tseung Kwan O). In mid-2012, the population of the areas was 1,012,000.

Haven of Hope Hospital
Tseung Kwan O Hospital
United Christian Hospital

, the cluster has 2,371 in-patient beds and 6,483 full-time equivalent staff .

References

External links

Hospital Authority
Kowloon